Michael Allen Ramsey (born December 3, 1960) is an American former professional ice hockey defenseman who played 1,070 regular season games in the NHL for the Buffalo Sabres, Pittsburgh Penguins, and Detroit Red Wings between 1980 and 1997, after helping the 1980 U.S. Olympic hockey team win the Miracle On Ice and the gold medal at the 1980 Winter Olympics.

Playing career

Amateur
Ramsey attended Roosevelt High School in Minneapolis. He was considered the top high school defenseman in Minnesota as a senior in 1977–78. He also attended the U.S. National Junior training camp in summer of 1978 and participated in the 1979 World Junior Ice Hockey Championships while playing at the University of Minnesota.

Ramsey was the youngest member of the U.S. team that upset the Soviet Union at the 1980 Winter Olympics in Lake Placid, New York, in an event known as the Miracle on Ice. The American team, which went on to defeat Finland for the gold medal, was coached by Herb Brooks, who was Ramsey's coach at the University of Minnesota.

Professional
Drafted 11th overall by the Buffalo Sabres in the 1979 NHL Entry Draft, Ramsey would go on to play in the National Hockey League immediately after the Olympics. He had one of the most successful NHL careers of the 1980 U.S. Olympians, playing 14 seasons for the Sabres. Primarily known as an offensive defenseman as an amateur, he successfully adapted to the bigger and tougher NHL by becoming a stay-at-home defenseman in Buffalo. Highlights of his career with the Sabres include playing in the NHL All-Star Game four times (1982, 1983, 1985, and 1986) as well as being a member of the NHL All-Star team that played the Soviet national hockey team in Rendez-Vous '87. Ramsey also served as the Sabres' team captain from 1990 to 1992. He continued to play for Team USA during this time, participating in the 1982 Ice Hockey World Championships and the 1984 and 1987 Canada Cup tournaments.

Ramsey's old coach in Buffalo, Scotty Bowman, brought him to the Pittsburgh Penguins during the 1992–93 season to shore up the team's defensive corps as it made a run at a third straight Stanley Cup championship. However, the Penguins were upset in the second round by the New York Islanders. After another season in Pittsburgh, Ramsey signed with the Detroit Red Wings, who by now were also coached by Bowman, as a free agent. In April 1995, Ramsey became teammates with defenseman Viacheslav Fetisov when Detroit acquired the latter in a trade with the New Jersey Devils; Fetisov had played for the Soviets during the 1980 Olympics. That year, Ramsey played in his first Stanley Cup Finals series, but the Red Wings were swept by the Devils, who had Ramsey's 1980 Olympic teammate, Neal Broten, on their roster. The next season, the powerful Red Wings set a league record for most wins in a single season with 62, but were ousted in the Western Conference Finals by the eventual Stanley Cup champion Colorado Avalanche. Ramsey played only two games for Detroit in the 1996-97 season before retiring.

Post-playing career
Ramsey returned to Minnesota after finishing his NHL career where he ran a sporting goods store named "Gold Medal Sports" and played senior league hockey. He returned to the NHL in 1997 to serve as an assistant coach with the Buffalo Sabres, and in 2000 he took a similar position with the Minnesota Wild.  He was with the Wild until June 2010.

He was inducted into the United States Hockey Hall of Fame in 2001.

Family
Ramsey has three children: Hannah, Rachel and Jack. Hannah is a student at the University of St. Thomas in St. Paul. Rachel, who played hockey at Minnetonka High School,  plays defense for the University of Minnesota. During the 2011–2012 season she was the Gopher's top-scoring freshman, the top-scoring rookie defenseman in the WCHA, was named to the WCHA All-Rookie team, and helped lead the team to back to back national championships in 2011–2012 and 2012–2013.  She currently works as a DJ on K102 Radio in Minneapolis. Jack, who was drafted by the Chicago Blackhawks in the 2014 NHL Entry Draft, played his sophomore and junior hockey seasons at Minnetonka High School before forgoing his senior to play with the Penticton Vees of the BCHL. As of 2017 he is playing at the University of Minnesota.

In popular culture
Ramsey was played by Joseph Cure in the 2004 Disney film Miracle, which was about the Miracle on Ice hockey team.

Awards and achievements

Played in NHL All-Star Game (1982, 1983, 1985, 1986)
Played in NHL Rendez-Vous '87

Career statistics

Regular season and playoffs

International

See also
List of members of the United States Hockey Hall of Fame
List of NHL players with 1,000 games played
Miracle on Ice

References

External links
 
 Ramsey's bio at hockeydraftcentral.com

Note: Ramsey was named Sabres captain during the 1990–91 NHL season (after Foligno was traded). He later resigned the captaincy during the 1992–93 NHL season, in favor of LaFontaine.

1960 births
1980 US Olympic ice hockey team
American men's ice hockey defensemen
Buffalo Sabres captains
Buffalo Sabres coaches
Buffalo Sabres draft picks
Buffalo Sabres players
Detroit Red Wings players
Ice hockey people from Minneapolis
Ice hockey players at the 1980 Winter Olympics
Living people
Medalists at the 1980 Winter Olympics
Minnesota Wild coaches
Minnesota Golden Gophers men's ice hockey players
National Hockey League All-Stars
National Hockey League first-round draft picks
Olympic gold medalists for the United States in ice hockey
Pittsburgh Penguins players
United States Hockey Hall of Fame inductees
NCAA men's ice hockey national champions
Roosevelt High School (Minnesota) alumni
Sports coaches from Minneapolis